An Rabharta Glas – Green Left is an unregistered Irish political party, launched on 5 June 2021 as a split from the Green Party. At launch, it had two councillors, who had previously been elected as Green Party members — Lorna Bogue, on Cork City Council, and Liam Sinclair, on South Dublin County Council. Its outlook has been described as "eco-socialist".

History
The party was launched on 5 June 2021. It was formed by former members of the Green Party, who had resigned in protest over various issues in 2020 and 2021, including the handling of the Mother and Baby Homes Commission of Investigation report by Roderic O'Gorman, and disagreement over the programme for government.

It was reported to have approximately 30 members on launch.

Lorna Bogue was elected as party leader at the party's inaugural AGM.

Ideology and policies
An Rabharta Glas is a left-wing green party, described as "eco-socialist". Its mission statement is to "reconstruct the political system so that it serves people and nature, not profit and extraction." The party has stated it favours state intervention in the economy to protect against "vested interests". In terms of food production, the party has been described as favouring "decorporation" and decarbonisation.

References

External links

2021 establishments in Ireland
Ecosocialist parties
Environmentalism in the Republic of Ireland
Green parties in Europe
Left-wing politics in Ireland
Political parties established in 2021
Political parties in the Republic of Ireland
Socialist parties in Ireland